Acleris cribellata is a species of moth of the family Tortricidae. It is found in the Russian Far East (Ussuri).

Adults are on wing in July and August.

The larvae feed on Acer tegmentosum, Schisandra chinensi and Fraxinus mandschurica. They live in folded leaves which are folded along the midrib and wrapped in silk. The larvae have a light yellow body and a yellow head.

References

Moths described in 1965
cribellata
Moths of Asia